Paedocypris carbunculus is a tiny species of cyprinid fish endemic to peat swamps and blackwater streams in Central Kalimantan, Borneo, Indonesia. This shoaling species has been kept and bred for several generations in aquariums.

The male Paedocypris carbunculus has a unique pelvic fin, along with a keratinized pad, that allows the male to latch on to the female for sexual reproduction.

References

Paedocypris
Cyprinid fish of Asia
Freshwater fish of Indonesia
Taxa named by Maurice Kottelat
Endemic fauna of Borneo
Endemic fauna of Indonesia
Fish described in 2008